The Turl Street Arts Festival (TSAF) is an annual festival held in February, involving students from the three Turl Street Colleges in Oxford, England: Jesus College, Exeter College and Lincoln College. It is one of several arts festivals in Oxford, and has been running since 1997.

TSAF is organized by a committee of students from the three colleges. Each year a different College takes lead of the Festival, nominating the Chair of the Festival from within their Junior Common Room (JCR).

Originally created by the members of the Colleges including Chris Millington and Caroline Russell with support from the Chaplains of the colleges and the organ scholars, the week varies from more formal events such as choral recitals to open mic nights and several plays. There are also opportunities for photography exhibitions and short film previews. The week traditionally ends with a Sunday Choral Evensong led by the combined choirs of the three colleges.

The 2019 festival will run between Friday 8 February and Sunday 15 February.

Past festivals 

In 2006, the Festival was opened by the Archbishop of Canterbury, Rowan Williams. Martha Fiennes was another guest speaker.

In 2017, Ed Wignall and Eleanor Begley were co-Presidents, both from Exeter College.

Previous themes have included 'Decades' in 2016 and 'Zodiac' in 2017.

External links 
 
 Article in the Oxford Student
 Article in the Cherwell

Festivals in Oxford
Exeter College, Oxford
Jesus College, Oxford
Lincoln College, Oxford